The 2004 NASDAQ-100 Open was a tennis tournament played on outdoor hard courts. It was the 20th edition of the Miami Masters and was part of the Masters Series of the 2004 ATP Tour and of Tier I of the 2004 WTA Tour. Both the men's and women's events took place at the Tennis Center at Crandon Park in Key Biscayne, Florida in the United States from March 24 through April 4, 2004.

The men's tournament was notable as it featured the first ever meeting between Roger Federer and Rafael Nadal, with Nadal winning in straight sets. The women’s tournament was also notable for featuring the first ever meeting between Maria Sharapova and Serena Williams, with Williams winning in straight sets.

Finals

Men's singles

 Andy Roddick defeated  Guillermo Coria 6–7(2–7), 6–3, 6–1 (Coria retired)
 It was Roddick's 2nd title of the year and the 15th of his career. It was his 1st Masters title of the year and his 3rd overall.

Women's singles

 Serena Williams defeated  Elena Dementieva 6–1, 6–1
 It was Williams' 1st title of the year and the 24th of her career. It was her 1st Tier I title of the year and her 7th overall.

Men's doubles

 Wayne Black /  Kevin Ullyett defeated  Jonas Björkman /  Todd Woodbridge 6–2, 7–6(14–12)
 It was Black's 1st title of the year and the 15th of his career. It was Ullyett's 1st title of the year and the 21st of his career.

Women's doubles

 Nadia Petrova /  Meghann Shaughnessy defeated  Svetlana Kuznetsova /  Elena Likhovtseva 6–2, 6–3
 It was Petrova's 1st title of the year and the 5th of her career. It was Shaughnessy's 1st title of the year and the 8th of her career.

References

External links
 Official website
 ATP Tournament Profile
 WTA Tournament Profile

 
NASDAQ-100 Open
NASDAQ-100 Open
NASDAQ-100 Open
Miami Open (tennis)
NASDAQ-100 Open
NASDAQ-100 Open
NASDAQ-100 Open